The Kolpak ruling is a European Court of Justice ruling handed down on 8 May 2003 in favour of Maroš Kolpak, a Slovak handball player. It declared that citizens of countries which have signed European Union Association Agreements have the same right to freedom of work and movement within the EU as EU citizens. Thus any restrictions placed on their right to work (such as quotas setting maximum numbers of such foreign players in sports teams) are deemed illegal under EU law.  The legal actions in Germany set a precedent for professional sports in Europe, which have had a wide-ranging effect, especially in regard to English county cricket and European professional rugby.

A Kolpak player, or Kolpak, was a term used in the United Kingdom for people from overseas playing in the domestic leagues in cricket and both rugby codes, who were subject to the Kolpak ruling. However, the system no longer applies in the UK, following its exit from the European Union.

Court ruling
The Court of Justice's Bosman ruling in 1995 declared that, in accordance with the EC Treaty rules regarding freedom of movement for workers, no resident of the European Union should be restricted from working in another part of the EU on the grounds of their nationality. For example, a German football team could not be prevented from signing a Greek player, because both nations are members of the EU.

Maroš Kolpak was a Slovak handball player, who was legally resident and working in Germany, and had been playing for the German second division handball side TSV Östringen since 1997. The German Handball Association had a rule (Rule 15) which prohibited its member clubs from fielding more than two non-EU citizens. At that time, Slovakia was not yet a member of the European Union (it joined the EU in May 2004), and therefore the Bosman ruling did not apply to its citizens. Slovakia did however have an Association Agreement with the European Union.

Kolpak was ejected by his club in 2000 because they had filled their quota of two non-EU players. Kolpak challenged the German Handball Association, claiming that Rule 15, by treating him differently from German citizens, placed an illegal restriction on his freedom of movement as a worker. The German Handball Association held that equality of treatment applied only to citizens of European Union countries (as per the Bosman Ruling) and not to non-EU citizens. The case was referred by the German higher court to the European Court of Justice, for a determination on whether the Association Agreement between Slovakia and the European Union provided equal rights for Slovak workers who were living and working legally within the EU. The Court ruled in favour of Kolpak.

Thus the Kolpak Ruling declares that citizens of countries which have applicable Association Agreements with the EU, and who are lawfully working within an EU country, have equal rights to work as EU citizens, and cannot have restrictions such as quotas placed upon them. Such countries include those within the African, Caribbean and Pacific (ACP) group of states, such as South Africa, Jamaica and Zimbabwe.

Implications for sport

Cricket
In practice, the decision allowed English county cricket clubs to employ the services of a multitude of overseas cricketers, especially from South Africa. Prior to the Kolpak ruling ECB rules had limited each county to one overseas (non-EU) professional.

County cricket clubs could already employ any number of EU residents under the Bosman ruling. However,  there were no other Test cricket nations within the EU except (from 2017) Ireland; this explains why it was Kolpak, not Bosman, which had the significant impact on English county cricket. The largest group of countries with an association agreement with the EU is the ACP Group of States, which includes South Africa, Zimbabwe, and many of the nations that supply the West Indies cricket team.

The English and Wales Cricket Board ruled that a player must not have represented their own country for over twelve months in order to qualify for Kolpak status, but after South African Jacques Rudolph signed for Yorkshire, they admitted that this rule was unenforceable.

In an effort to combat the influx of Kolpak players, the ECB linked the central payments made to counties to the number of English qualified players who play for that county. That meant that every game a Kolpak player played instead of an English qualified player, a county received £1,100 less from the ECB. Because that was classed as a way of encouraging counties to develop young players who could go on to play for England, rather than a restrictive quota system, it was legal under the EU rules. However, the system did not result in a significant drop in the number of Kolpak players, because counties chose to continue to sign foreign players, rather than maximise their handout from the ECB. The influx reached a peak in 2008 when, during a match between Northamptonshire and Leicestershire, half the players on the field were from non-EU countries.

In 2008, the EU changed its reading of the Cotonou Agreement, the Association Agreement between the EU and the ACP countries. It then stated that the Cotonou agreement should not be interpreted as mandating free movement of labour, but rather the free trade of goods and services. The Home Office was subsequently able to introduce new rules placing restrictions on Kolpak players, stating that only those who had held a valid work permit for four years had the right to be treated the same as EU citizens.

After the UK withdrew from the European Union on 31 January 2020, the Kolpak ruling ceased to have any effect there at the end of 2020.

Rugby
In rugby league and rugby union, the Kolpak ruling has allowed teams to sign many players from Fiji, Tonga, Samoa and South Africa, all of which are also ACP countries. Many rugby union clubs have also signed South African players under Kolpak, most notably the French team RC Toulonnais and English team Saracens F.C.

In a related issue, New Zealand player Andrew Mehrtens, who was born in Durban, decided to pursue a South African passport when he signed with the English side Harlequins for the 2005–06 National Division One season, as it would enable the club to sign another non-EU and non-Kolpak player.

See also
 Bosman ruling, a similar case covering freedom of movement for EU citizens
 List of Kolpak cricketers

Notes and references

External links
Text of the ECJ judgment (PDF)
Link to ECJ documents related to decision
Kolpak ruling
 Counties fear Kolpak

Cricket laws and regulations
European Union labour law
Court of Justice of the European Union case law
Rugby union terminology
Rugby league terminology
Sports law
2003 in case law
2003 in Europe
2003 in sports
German case law
2003 in Germany